Jersey City Urby is a residential tower complex in Jersey City, New Jersey, United States. The first tower was proposed in 2012 as URL Harborside, and later renamed to Urby Harborside. The construction of the first tower began in 2014, and completed in 2016. At , the 70-story tower is the fourth tallest building in New Jersey, as well as in Jersey City . It overtook Ocean Resort Casino in Atlantic City for the title of second place when it was completed, but moved down to fourth after the constructions of 99 Hudson Street and Journal Squared Tower 2 respectively. The company, Urby, also has three other locations such as Staten Island, Stamford, and Harrison. In July 2022, the city council gave approval of construction of two similar buildings in the complex.

Jersey City Urby Tower One 

There are three types of apartments within the tower, including studio, one bedroom, and two bedrooms. The apartments have large windows for full city views. They contain their own washer and dryer, built-in storage, full amenities within the kitchen, and air conditioning. There is a maximum of 2 pets allowed, with a $75 rental fee for each cat and dog. Rentals range from $2,335 to $4,686.

Amenities 
Most of the building's shared social space features are located on the 9th floor. This includes a 24/7 concierge service, a heated swimming pool, a pool patio, a BBQ, a green space, a fully equipped gym with classes, outdoor lounges with fire pits, Canard Cafe, a post room, the Urby Kitchen (a space dedicated to classes and events), filtered water stations, cultural events, food tasting and local chef Q&As throughout the year.

Transportation is convenient, as it is within a 10-minute walk of three PATH stations: Exchange Place, Grove Street, and Newport.

See also 

 List of tallest buildings in New Jersey
 List of tallest buildings in Jersey City
 List of tallest buildings in the United States

References 

Residential buildings completed in 2016
Skyscrapers in Jersey City, New Jersey
Residential buildings in New Jersey
Residential skyscrapers in Jersey City, New Jersey